Toutain is a French surname of Norman origin, itself from Old Norse Þórsteinn. Notable people with the surname include:

Jules Toutain (1865–1961), French archeologist
Roland Toutain (1905–1977), French actor
Thierry Toutain (born 1962), French racewalker

See also
Pierre Toutain-Dorbec (born 1951), French photographer
Thorsten
Toutainville, a French commune in département Eure, région Normandy

French-language surnames